The second election to Dyfed County Council was held in May 1977. It was preceded by the 1973 election and followed by the 1981 election.  There were a number of unopposed returns, particularly in rural parts of the county.

Overview

Carmarthenshire

The main feature of the results in Carmarthenshire was a Plaid Cymru challenge to Labour in the more urban part of the county although they lost the one seat they held on the previous council.

Ward Results (Cardiganshire)

Aberaeron No.1

Aberaeron No. 2

Aberaeron No.3

Aberystwyth No.1

Aberystwyth No.2

Aberystwyth No. 3

Aberystwyth Rural No. 1

Aberystwyth Rural No.2

Aberystwyth Rural No.3

Cardigan

Lampeter

Teifiside No.1

Teifiside No.2

Teifiside No.3

Tregaron

Ward Results (Carmarthenshire)

Ammanford No. 1

Ammanford No.2

Berwick

Burry Port East

-->

Burry Port West

-->

Carmarthen No. 1
Anthony Earle was elected at a by-election in 1975 following the death of T. Idwal Jones

-->

Carmarthen No. 2

Carmarthen No. 3

Carmarthen Rural No.1

Carmarthen Rural No.2

Carmarthen Rural No. 3

Carmarthen Rural No. 4

Carmarthen Rural No. 5

Carmarthen Rural No. 6

Carmarthen Rural No. 7

Cwmamman

Felinfoel

Hengoed

Llandeilo No.1

Llandeilo No.2

Llandeilo No.3

Llandeilo No.4

Llandeilo No.5

Llandeilo No.6

Llanedi

Llanelli No.1

Llanelli No.2

Llanelli No. 3

Llanelli No.4

Llanelli No.5

Llanelli No. 6

Llanelli No.7

Llangennech

Llan-non

Newcastle Emlyn No.1

Newcastle Emlyn No.2

Pembrey

Pontyberem

Trimsaran

Westfa

Ward Results (Pembrokeshire)

Cemaes No. 1

Cemaes No. 2

Fishguard and Goodwick No. 1

Fishguard and Goodwick No. 2

Haverfordwest No.1

Haverfordwest No. 2

Haverfordwest Rural No. 1

Haverfordwest Rural No. 2

Haverfordwest Rural No. 3

Haverfordwest Rural No. 4

Haverfordwest Rural No. 5

Milford Haven No. 1

Milford Haven No. 2

Milford Haven No. 3

Narberth No. 1

Narberth No. 2

Narberth No. 3

Neyland and Llanstadwell

Pembroke No. 1

Pembroke No. 2

Pembroke No. 3

Pembroke Rural No. 1

Pembroke Rural No. 2

Tenby

References

1977
1977 Welsh local elections